Mark Richards may refer to:

Mark Richards (politician) (1760–1844), US congressman from Vermont
Mark Andrew Richards (born 1952), American scientist
Mark Richards (cardiologist) (born 1955), New Zealand cardiologist
Mark Richards (surfer) (born 1957), Australian surfing champion
Mark Richards (sailor) (born 1967), Australian yachtsman
Mark Richards (cricketer) (born 1974), former English cricketer
Mark Richards (rugby union) (born 1989), South African rugby union and international rugby sevens player
Mark Richards (jockey), 1990s UK and Irish based steeplechase rider in Triumph Hurdle
Mark Russell Richards, English scholar and authority on the life and work of Charles Dodgson (Lewis Carroll)

See also
Marc Richards (born 1982), English footballer
Mark Richard (born 1955), writer
Richard Marks (disambiguation)